Harrison Hot Springs Water Aerodrome  is located adjacent to Harrison Hot Springs, British Columbia, Canada. It is located at the south end of Harrison Lake, directly across from the Harrison Hot Springs Resort.

See also
 List of airports in the Lower Mainland

References

Seaplane bases in British Columbia
Lower Mainland
Registered aerodromes in British Columbia